Michael J. Carrell (April 10, 1944 – May 29, 2013) was an American politician and educator.

Born in Tacoma, Washington, Carrell graduated from Pacific Lutheran University with a degree in education. He was a teacher in middle school, high school, and college. Carrell served in the Washington House of Representatives 1995–2004 as a Republican. He then served as member of the Washington State Senate. He served the 28th district from 2004 until his death on May 29, 2013, in Seattle, of complications of myelodysplastic syndrome.

References

1944 births
2013 deaths
Deaths from myelodysplastic syndrome
Pacific Lutheran University alumni
Republican Party members of the Washington House of Representatives
Republican Party Washington (state) state senators
Politicians from Tacoma, Washington